Steven C. Roach (born November 1, 1964) is an American professor of International Relations who writes on global ethics, the politics of international law, critical international theory, minority rights, and South Sudan's politics. He is Professor of International Relations and former Director of Graduate Programs (Ph.D. MA, MLA. MALACS) at the School of Interdisciplinary Global Studies at the University of South Florida.

Education and career

Roach earned his doctorate from the Josef Korbel School of International Studies at the University of Denver in 2002. He received his M.A from San Francisco State University in 1995 and his BA from Colgate University in 1987. From 2002 to 2005 he was appointed visiting professor at Colorado State University at Pueblo and a visiting lecturer at the University of Colorado Boulder. He was appointed Assistant Professor of International Relations in 2005 and was later awarded full Professorship. In 2022, he was the recipient of an Outstanding Faculty Award, Global Excellence Award and the Theodor and Venette Askounes-Ashford Distinguished Scholar Award. Prior to this he was awarded a Fulbright Scholar grant to teach and research at the Universidad Autónoma de Madrid, where he was recognized as Honorary Professor. In 2020, he was appointed Country Expert of the United States Agency for International Development (USAID) Democracy, Human Rights, and Governance (DRG) assessment team in South Sudan. The team's assessment report was presented to the U.S. State Department and Congress and now serves as the basis of USAID’s five-year strategic mission in the country. He is a member of several editorial and consultancy boards.

Research

Ethical values and global politics

A central focus of Roach's work is the interaction of ethical values and political power. His recent work uses the relationship between decency and moral accountability to study the growing political pressures that threaten the liberal international order. In a 2016 interview with E-IR, he points out that the gap between humanitarian values and emotion has never been greater; that it is not simply the hostile emotions that explain right-wing populism, but liberalism's detachment from these sentiments.

Politics of international law

Roach is one of the first political scientists to systematically explore the political forces shaping the International Criminal Court. His notion of political legalism functions as a pragmatic instrument to study how best to bring justice to the worst perpetrators of serious crimes. In an article published by Global Governance, he argues that the court cannot escape the effects of operating in an international system. It needs to confront this difficult and complex political reality of the ICC  by devising new ways of thinking about its agency and by adopting the political strategies needed to balance the demand for global justice against the constraints of the international system.

Governance in South Sudan

Roach has conducted extensive field research in South Sudan and written on the many challenges facing the country, including corruption, food insecurity, accountability, and extreme violence. His articles and short essays have appeared in International Affairs, Foreign Affairs, and African Arguments. In 2023, he authored South Sudan's Fateful Struggle, which provides a sweeping account of the country's enduring state of war.

Selected publications

Books
South Sudan's Fateful Struggle: Building Peace in a State of War. New York: Oxford University Press, 2023. 
Moral Responsibility in Twenty-First Century Warfare: Just War Theory and the Ethical Challenges of Autonomous Weapons Systems (eds). Albany, NY: SUNY Press, with Amy E. Eckert, 2020. 
Handbook of Critical International Relations (ed). Cheltenham, UK: Edward Elgar Publishing, 2020. 
Decency and Difference: Humanity and the Global Challenge of Identity Politics. Ann Arbor, MI: University of Michigan Press. 2019. 
The Challenge of Governance in South Sudan: Corruption, Peacebuilding, and Foreign Intervention (eds), London and New York: Routledge, 2019, with Derrick K. Hudson. .
International Relations: The Key Concepts. Third and Second Edition. London and New York: Routledge, 2014, 2009, with Martin Griffiths and Terry O'Callaghan  (Chinese translation, Peking University Press, 2015; Turkish translation, Nobel Academic Press, 2013, Arabic translation, Gulf Research Center, 2009).
Critical Theory of International Politics: Complementarity, Justice, and Governance. London and New York: Routledge. 2010. 
Governance, Order, and the International Criminal Court: Between Realpolitik and a Cosmopolitan Court (ed.). Oxford: Oxford University Press, 2009. .
Fifty Key Thinkers in International Relations. London and New York: Routledge, 2009, with Martin Griffiths and M. Scott Solomon, 2009.  (Portuguese translation, University of Recife, 2005; Turkish translation, Nobel Academic Press, 2011; Persian Translation, University of Tehran Press, 2014).
Critical Theory and International Relations: A Reader (ed.). London and New York: Routledge.2009. 
Politicizing the International Criminal Court: The Convergence of Politics, Ethics, and Law. Lanham, MD: Rowman & Littlefield Publishers. 2006 .
Cultural Autonomy, Minority Rights, and Globalization. London and New York: Routledge. 2005 .

Articles

South Sudan: A Volatile Dynamic of Accountability and Peace, International Affairs, 2016.
How Political is the ICC? Pressing Challenges and the Need for Diplomatic Efficacy, Global Governance, 2013.
Critical International Theory and Meta-Dialectics: Fourth Debate or Fifth Dimension? Millennium, 2007.
Arab States and the Role of Islam in the International Criminal Court, Political Studies, 2005.
Minority Rights and an Emergent International Right to Autonomy: A Normative and Historical Assessment,” The International Journal on Minority and Group Rights, 2004.

References

External links 
Home Page

1964 births
Living people
International relations scholars